Augustine Hoey (born Thomas Kenneth Hoey, 22 December 1915 - 26 September 2017) was an English priest who served as the prior of the Anglo-Catholic Community of the Resurrection in Mirfield in West Yorkshire and also at the Royal Foundation of St Katharine.

Hoey spent most of his life as an Anglican, but converted to Catholicism and was ordained as a Catholic priest in 1995. He was made a monsignor by Pope Francis.

References

1915 births
2017 deaths
Anglican priest converts to Roman Catholicism
20th-century English Roman Catholic priests
Alumni of St Edmund Hall, Oxford
British centenarians
Anglo-Catholic clergy
Men centenarians
20th-century English Anglican priests